Tibor Zoltán Szólláth (born April 4, 1969) is a Hungarian engineer and politician, mayor of Hajdúnánás since 2010. He became a member of the National Assembly (MP) from the Nógrád County Regional List of the Fidesz in the 2010 parliamentary election.

References

1969 births
Living people
Hungarian engineers
Mayors of places in Hungary
Fidesz politicians
Members of the National Assembly of Hungary (2010–2014)
People from Hajdúnánás